Scenes from a Marriage is an American drama television miniseries developed, written and directed by Hagai Levi produced for HBO and starring Oscar Isaac and Jessica Chastain. It is an English-language remake of the 1973 Swedish miniseries of the same name by Ingmar Bergman. It was presented at the 2021 Venice Film Festival and it premiered on September 12, 2021 on HBO. For his performance, Isaac was nominated for a Primetime Emmy Award, a SAG Award and a Golden Globe Award for Best Actor – Miniseries or Television Film.

Premise
An adaptation of the 1970s Swedish miniseries focusing on contemporary American couples.

Cast

Starring
Oscar Isaac as Jonathan Levy
Jessica Chastain as Mira Phillips

Co-starring
Nicole Beharie as Kate
Corey Stoll as Peter
Sunita Mani as Danielle
Shirley Rumierk as Dr. Varona
Sophia Kopera as Ava Levy
Anna Rust as Veronica
Michael Aloni as Poli

Episodes

Production
It was announced in July 2020 that HBO had given the miniseries a greenlight, with Hagai Levi writing and directing and Oscar Isaac and Michelle Williams serving as executive producers. Upon the miniseries order announcement, Isaac and Williams were also cast to star. Williams would be forced to exit her starring role in October due to a scheduling conflict, but would remain as an executive producer. She was replaced with Jessica Chastain. In November 2020, Sunita Mani was cast in a supporting role. Nicole Beharie, Corey Stoll and Tovah Feldshuh would join in supporting roles in January 2021.

Filming began in New York City in October 2020, and was halted for two weeks in November after two production staff members tested positive for COVID-19.

Release
The five-episode limited series had its world premiere at the 78th Venice International Film Festival in the out of competition category. The limited series premiered on September 12, 2021 on HBO.

Reception

Critical response
The review aggregator website Rotten Tomatoes reported a 81% approval rating with an average rating of 7.50/10, based on 48 critic reviews. The website's critics consensus reads, "Though Scenes from a Marriages straightforward approach at times struggles to justify its existence, Jessica Chastain and Oscar Isaac's crackling chemistry and impressive performances are a sight to behold." Metacritic gave the series a weighted average score of 70 out of 100 based on 24 critic reviews, indicating "generally favorable reviews".

Ratings

Accolades

References

External links

2020s American drama television miniseries
2021 American television series debuts
2021 American television series endings
American television series based on Swedish television series
English-language television shows
HBO original programming
Adaptations of works by Ingmar Bergman
Television productions suspended due to the COVID-19 pandemic
Television series by Home Box Office